Tlahuelilpan is a town and one of the 84 municipalities of Hidalgo, in central-eastern Mexico. As of the 2010 census, the municipality had a total population of 17,153.

History

On January 18, 2019, the town was the site of a deadly pipeline explosion, killing 130 people and causing 48 injuries.
On March 24, 2019, a new leak from a clandestine gasoline operation was detected two months after the explosion that left 135 dead.

References

Municipalities of Hidalgo (state)
Populated places in Hidalgo (state)